Sonamoo (stylized as SONAMOO, lit. Pine Tree) was a South Korean girl group formed by TS Entertainment.  Originally a seven-member group, members Sumin and Nahyun left the group in 2019 after they filed a lawsuit to terminate the contracts with their company. They made their debut on December 29, 2014, with the extended play, Deja Vu.

Career

2014–2015: Debut and further mini-album releases
On December 29, 2014, Sonamoo officially debuted with the release of their debut EP Deja Vu and single of the same name, and held their debut showcase performance. The album debuted at the number one spot on Gaon's weekly Album Chart. On February 25, 2015, they promoted "Just Go" as the second single off of their debut album.

On July 20, 2015, Sonamoo released their second extended play Cushion. The lead single of the same name was co-produced by EastWest and ₩uNo, who is known for being the former member of Speed, Taewoon. Members D.ana and NewSun also contributed to the writing of rap portions for two tracks:  "Deep" and "Let's Make A Movie". On September 1, 2015, they followed up their Cushion promotions by promoting "Round N Round" as the second single from the album.

2016–2021: Nahyun & Sumin's lawsuits, TS shutdown and disbandment 
On June 29, 2016, the group released their third extended play I Like U Too Much, with the title track of the same name. The album presented a new side of the group with a brighter "girls next door" image compared to their debut concepts which the members themselves called "dark". The group cited they looked up to Girls' Generation for inspiration with this album.

On January 9, 2017, the group released their first single album I Think I Love U. The lead single of the same name is a brighter dance track produced by Shin Hyuk, who has previously worked with SHINee and EXO.

On July 27, TS Entertainment unveiled a teaser image for Sonamoo's Happy Box Project, revealing that the group will be releasing three singles over the course of several months. The first single "Friday Night" was released on August 14. The rap portion of the single is written by NewSun.

Member Euijin was confirmed to be a contestant on KBS Idol Rebooting Project The Unit, which first aired on October 28, 2017. On November 6, Sonamoo continued their Happy Box Project releasing their single "I (Knew It)". The single is a medium tempo dance track composed by hitmaker e.one, who has previously worked with Wonder Girls.

As of September 23, 2019, both Nahyun and Sumin have filed lawsuits seeking to terminate their contract with TS Entertainment.

In January 2021, Sonamoo's label, TS Entertainment, privately shut down and deleted its website, leaving the fate of the group unknown.

On September 9, 2021, Euijin signed a contract with Mellow Entertainment, confirming that she had left TS Entertainment and the group.  On September 11, Minjae and NewSun also confirmed that they have left the company.  On September 13, D.ana confirmed she had also left the company. In her statement, she mentioned that Sonamoo's activities had come to an end.  On December 30, High.D confirmed that she has left the company and the group.

Past members
 Sumin – leader, sub-vocal
 Minjae – main vocal
 D.ana – low rap
 Nahyun – sub-vocal, lead dancer
 Euijin  – performance, lead vocal
 High.D – main vocal
 NewSun – high rap

Discography

Extended plays

Single albums

Singles

Soundtrack appearances

Music videos

Filmography

Reality shows

Web dramas

Awards and nominations

Melon Music Awards

|-
| 2015
| Sonamoo
| Best New Female Artist
|

Soribada Best K-Music Awards

|-
| 2017 
| Sonamoo
| New Korean Wave Music Star Award 
|

References

External links

 

Musical groups established in 2014
K-pop music groups
South Korean girl groups
2014 establishments in South Korea
TS Entertainment artists